The following is an incomplete list of association football clubs based in Guinea.
For a complete list see :Category:Football clubs in Guinea

A
AS Ashanti Golden Boys
AS Batè Nafadji
AS Kaloum Star
ASFAG
Athlético de Coléah

C
Club Industriel de Kamsar

F
FC Séquence de Dixinn
Fello Star

H
Hafia Football Club
Horoya AC

S
Sankaran FC
Santoba FC
Satellite FC

T
Tabounsou FC

U
Université Club Kankan

External links
 RSSSF

 
Guinea
Football clubs
Football clubs